The Harvard School of Dental Medicine (HSDM) is the dental school of Harvard University. It is located in the Longwood Medical Area in Boston, Massachusetts. In addition to the DMD degree, HSDM offers specialty training programs, advanced training programs, and a PhD program through the Harvard Graduate School of Arts and Sciences. The program considers dentistry a specialty of medicine. Therefore, all students at HSDM experience dual citizenship between Harvard School of Dental Medicine and Harvard Medical School. Today, HSDM is the smallest school at Harvard University with a total student body of 280.

History

First university-based dental school
In the early 19th century a dentist was culturally understood as a tradesman, as opposed to a professional in the medical sense. Most dentists had either learned their trade through apprenticeships or simply offered their services to the public as self-proclaimed experts.

Even physicians and surgeons had once been tradesmen; for example, in the Middle Ages, many barbers were also surgeons by trade. The advent of science was a principal factor in the professionalization of medicine and surgery, because as scientific knowledge of biology, chemistry, and physiology advanced, it became necessary to be educated academically in order to master the full body of knowledge in medicine; as medicine changed from an art to a mixture of applied science and art, it became something qualitatively different from the folk medicine or traditional medicine that it had earlier been.

A similar evolution happened in dentistry, as dentists today are required to understand a large amount of oral medicine to earn license to practice. The move toward more formal dental education and the professionalization of dentistry in the United States began when the state of Maryland chartered the Baltimore College of Dental Surgery in 1840. The establishment of this independent college, which may have occurred after the University of Maryland refused to add dental education to its curriculum, exemplified the nineteenth-century debate over whether dentistry should be part of scholarly education or should be taught in separate trade schools. As a result of this resistance, the various American dental schools that existed by 1866 were all freestanding (not university-affiliated). They included the aforementioned Baltimore College of Dental Surgery (1840), the Ohio College of Dental Surgery (1845), the Philadelphia College of Dental Surgery (1852), the New York College of Dentistry (1852), the Philadelphia Dental College (1863), and the Missouri Dental College (1866).

The move towards university-based dental education institutions (as they exist today) began with the formation of Harvard Dental School in 1867. Reidar Fauske Sognnaes, noted oral pathologist and founding dean of the UCLA School of Dentistry, commented on the significance of the school's formation in a 1977 New England Journal of Medicine article:

There was a time when the mouth, relatively speaking, was considered a scientific "no-man's land." That was when dental education fell between academic chairs--literally between the eyes, ears, nose and throat. In the United States dentistry was denied the academic status of other segments of higher education until 1867, when Harvard established the first dental school affiliated with a university-based faculty of medicine.

Origins of DMD degree
Harvard was the first dental school to award the DMD degree. The establishment of the degree is detailed at Dental degree § DDS vs DMD degree. There is no difference between the DMD and DDS degree; all dentists must meet the same national and regional certification standards.

Renaming the school
The school was established as Harvard Dental School in 1867, but renamed the Harvard School of Dental Medicine in 1940. This symbolic change was made to emphasize the biological basis of oral medicine and the increasingly multidisciplinary focus of dental research.

Expansion of postdoctoral educational programs
In 1957, Harvard School of Dental Medicine was awarded a training grant from the National Institute of Dental Research (now the National Institute of Dental and Craniofacial Research) to expand its postdoctoral training programs. These new programs included an oral and maxillofacial surgery/MD/general surgery residency program; a Doctor of Medical Sciences (DMSc) degree; and 3- and 4-year joint-degree programs with an emphasis on combining clinical training with research into health policy, public health, and/or biomedical sciences.

The school's current post-doctoral programs include both school-based and hospital based residencies. School-based programs award the Master of Medical Science (MMSc) degree, with an optional Doctor of Medical Sciences (DMSc) degree available for those spending extra time on research activities.

School-based programs
 Orthodontics
 Endodontics
 Prosthodontics
 Periodontics
 Dental Public Health

Hospital-based programs
 Oral and Maxillofacial Surgery: combined Oral and Maxillofacial Surgery/General Surgery & MD program at Massachusetts General Hospital with MD degree awarded from Harvard Medical School
 Pediatric Dentistry: at Boston Children's Hospital
 General Practice Residency: combined program at Brigham and Women's Hospital and Massachusetts General Hospital

Major changes in predoctoral curriculum 1994
In 1994, a major change in the predoctoral curriculum included an increase of the predoctoral class size to 35, introduction of problem-based curriculum, and a switch from a 5-year program to a 4-year case-based curriculum.

Harvard Odontological Society
The Harvard Odontological Society was established in 1878 to promote education and good fellowship amongst graduates and faculty of the Harvard School of Dental Medicine. In continuous operation for over 130 years, the society meets four times a year in a Boston, Massachusetts venue to hold a regular business meeting and an educational presentation of interest to its members.

Harvard Dental Alumni Association
The Harvard School of Dental Medicine has an active group of over 2500 alumni who continue to participate in the day-to-day events of the school and are major contributors to the school's vision and goals for the new millennium.  In addition to publishing a quarterly bulletin, marking the current events of the school as well as the achievements of alumni, the Association also sponsors the annual Gold Medal and Silver Medal awards at graduation, honoring the valedictorian and salutatorian of the graduating class, respectively.

Early graduates
 Varaztad Kazanjian, pioneer in plastic surgery, Harvard's first Professor of Plastic Surgery, DMD 1905 
 Robert Tanner Freeman, first African-American graduate, DMD 1869
 Nathan Cooley Keep, founder and first Dean of Harvard Dental School, DMD 1870 (Honorary)
 George Franklin Grant, first African-American faculty member at Harvard University, DMD 1870
 Kurt Hermann Thoma, founder of American Board of Pathology, DMD 1911

Deans and former deans of US dental schools
 William Giannobile, Dean, Harvard School of Dental Medicine, DMSc '98, PD Perio '98
 Michael C. Alfano, former Dean, New York University, current Executive Vice-President of New York University, PD Perio '74
 Leon Assael, Editor Emeritus and former Editor-in-Chief, Journal of Oral and Maxillofacial Surgery, former Dean, University of Kentucky College of Dentistry, DMD '75
 Frank A. Catalanotto, former Dean, University of Florida College of Dentistry, Pediatric Dentistry Cert. '71
 Bruce Donoff, former Dean, Harvard School of Dental Medicine, DMD '67, OMFS '71
 Donald Giddon, former Dean, New York University College of Dentistry, DMD '67
 James R. Hupp, Editor-in-Chief, Journal of Oral and Maxillofacial Surgery, Vice Dean for Student and Faculty Experience, ES Floyd College of Medicine, Washington State University, former Editor-in-Chief, Oral Surgery Oral Medicine Oral Pathology, Oral Radiology and Endodontology, founding Dean, East Carolina University School of Dental Medicine, former Dean, University of Mississippi School of Dentistry, DMD '77
 Marjorie K. Jeffcoat, former Dean, University of Pennsylvania School of Dental Medicine, DMD '76, Perio '78
 Ira B. Lamster, Dean, Columbia University College of Dental Medicine, MMSc '80, Perio '80
 Lonnie Norris, former Dean, Tufts University School of Dental Medicine, DMD '76
No-Hee Park, former Dean, UCLA School of Dentistry, DMD '82
 Peter J. Polverini, former Dean, The University of Michigan School of Dentistry, DMSc, Oral Path
 Michael S. Reddy, Dean, University of California San Francisco, DMD '86, DMSc '89, Perio '89
 Ray C. Williams, former Dean, Stony Brook University School of Dental Medicine, Cert. Perio '73
 J. Howard Oaks, former Dean, Harvard School of Dental Medicine, Founding Dean, Stony Brook University School of Dental Medicine, former Vice President for Health Sciences, Stony Brook University, DMD '56
 Nadeem Y. Karimbux, Dean, Tufts University School of Dental Medicine. DMD, MMSc, Perio
 Russell S. Taichman, Dean, University of Alabama School of Dentistry, DMSc, Perio

Affiliated organizations
 American Student Dental Association
 Harvard Odontological Society

References

External links
 Harvard School of Dental Medicine
 The Forsyth Institute
 Harvard Odontological Society
 Harvard Dental Center
 Harvard Dental Museum

Harvard Medical School
Educational institutions established in 1867
1867 establishments in Massachusetts
Dental schools in Massachusetts